Darknet Diaries is an investigative podcast created by Jack Rhysider, chronicling true stories about crackers, malware, botnets, cryptography, cryptocurrency, cybercrime, and Internet privacy, all subjects falling under the umbrella of "tales from the dark side of the Internet".

Launched in October 2017, episodes average around 30 minutes to an hour, each meticulously dissecting a singular topic through original interviews, audio footage, and Rhysider's narration. The show's journalistic style has received widespread acclaim for its ability to "speak to your inner detective" and "productively substitute the thriller novel you intend to carry".

Production
Each episode begins with an introduction from Rhysider, followed by the theme music consisting of stringed instruments and a crunchy synthesizer, and then a structured narrative layered with interviews and suspenseful scoring.

For the first 40 episodes, Rhysider was responsible for all of the research, writing, narrating, editing, sound design, publishing, marketing, and logistics. Later on, due to a passionate cult following, Rhysider was able to enlist the help of additional writers, researchers, editors, and graphic designers.

By December 31, 2018, Darknet Diaries had amassed more than 1.2 million downloads. In 2019 only, there were more than 8.2 million downloads.

Impact and real-life influences 
Some notable episodes have been praised for their deep-diving insights, such as episode 17 "Finn", where Rhysider explores a curious child's evolution into becoming a hacker, illuminating Finn's loneliness and outsider-mentality, which, when coupled with his Asperger's, ADHD, and affinity for computers, inspired Finn to hack his high school's network. "Finn" was also adapted and featured on the WNYC Studios podcast Snap Judgment.

More details emerged regarding the case details for Roman Seleznev's 27-year prison sentence, thanks to a Seattle computer crimes prosecutor, court documents, and reporting by Rhysider on episode 32 "The Carder", which covered the Secret Service's tracking of Seleznev's online movements in the 2000s.

Rhysider has been quoted as saying "a lot of hacks go unsolved"; however, at least in Seleznev's case, selling cards was his specialty while his hacking abilities were mediocre.

Episode 27 "Chartbreakers" was highlighted for its investigation into the manipulation of the Apple Podcasts Top Charts through a vast industry termed as "dark podcast marketing", the catalysts for this industry originating from Bangladesh. Rhysider received and then subsequently released photos of the promoters themselves.

Crossovers and appearances 
Rhysider has made appearances on a variety of other programs, the most notable being Snap Judgment and the Lit Hub/Podglomerate Storybound, where he is accompanied by an original score from singer-songwriter Shane Brown.

Other podcast appearances include Smashing Security, The Many Hats Club, Brakeing Down Security, The Word From Mouth, InfoSec ICU, The Cyberwire, Podcast Business Journal Spotlight, Overnight America, Aidan Wheller Podcast and Audio Reviews, Getting into InfoSec, Grimerica, Cyber Speaks Live, and Chartable Radio.

Episodes

Reception
When describing the show's style and presentation, various media outlets have drawn comparisons between Reply All and This American Life, with The Irish Times writing, "Darknet Diaries is...where storytelling is mixed with investigative techniques to provide a strong narrative with real people at its core." The New York Times wrote, "Though the episodes are often startlingly short, condensing stories into 30 minutes that could easily justify a full hour, Rhysider’s hypnotic narration and deep expertise creates results that are never less than gripping."

The Boston Globe called Darknet Diaries "a true-crime podcast with no blood [and] no bodies...[leaving] you wondering why there aren't more hacks, breaches, and cyber-crime."

Miranda Sawyer of The Observer, sister paper to The Guardian, highlighted the podcast's reported "small disasters" of online life, writing: "Neatly edited and charmingly presented by Jack Rhysider, the podcast does occasionally stray into nerdiness, but it’s chock-full of real-life examples of when our virtual lives fail."

Vulture magazine listed Darknet Diaries among its list of "52 of the Best True-Crime Podcasts", following what they deemed as "the post-Serial boom", citing how "some of these [cybercrimes] may hit a little too close to home" while also advising listeners: "Cover your laptop camera, throw that iPhone in the river, and hang out in that weird no-reception corner of your home."

Awards
 Runner-up in the 2018 Discover Pods Award for Best Technology Podcast
 Winner of the 2018 Quartz Casties for Best Technology Episode
 Winner of the 2019 European Security Blogger Awards for Best New Cybersecurity Podcast

See also
 List of American crime podcasts

References

External links
 
Official Discord
Subreddit

Audio podcasts
2017 podcast debuts
Crime podcasts
Technology podcasts